Ho Pui or Ho Pui Tsuen is the same of several places in Hong Kong:

 Ho Pui (North District), in North District, Hong Kong
 Ho Pui Tsuen (Tsuen Wan District), in Tai Wo Hau, Tsuen Wan District
 Ho Pui (Yuen Long District), in Yuen Long District
 Ho Pui Reservoir, an irrigation reservoir in Hong Kong